is a town located in Aomori Prefecture, Japan. ,  the town had an estimated population of 8,669 people in 4108 households and a population density of 53 persons per km2. Skiing is very popular in Ōwani Town, and seven Olympic athletes have grown up there.

Geography
Ōwani, located in Minamitsugaru District, occupies the hilly southern border between south-central Aomori Prefecture and northern Akita Prefecture, to the southeast of the city of Hirosaki.

Neighbouring municipalities 
Aomori Prefecture
Hirosaki
Hirakawa
Akita Prefecture
Ōdate

Climate
The town has a cold humid continental climate (Köppen Dfb) characterized by warm short summers and long cold winters with heavy snowfall. The average annual temperature in Ōwani is 9.6 °C. The average annual rainfall is 1397 mm with September as the wettest month. The temperatures are highest on average in August, at around 23.4 °C, and lowest in January, at around -3.0 °C.

Demographics
Per Japanese census data, the population of Ōwani has decreased steadily over the past 60 years.

History
During the Edo period, the area around Ōwani was controlled by the Tsugaru clan of Hirosaki Domain. After the Meiji Restoration, it became a village within Minamitsugaru District of Aomori Prefecture with the establishment of the modern municipalities system on April 1, 1889. On April 1, 1923, Ōwani was proclaimed a town. On July 1, 1954, it annexed neighboring Kuradate Town, but lost a portion of its territory to Hirosaki City on September 30, 1964.

Government
Ōwani has a mayor-council form of government with a directly elected mayor and a unicameral town legislature of 12 members. Ōwani, together with the city of Hirakawa contributes three members to the Aomori Prefectural Assembly. In terms of national politics, the town is part of Aomori 3rd district of the lower house of the Diet of Japan.

Economy
The economy of Ōwani is heavily dependent on agriculture, horticulture and forestry. Tourism from ski resorts and onsen hot springs also contribute to the local economy. Mount Ajara was a venue for the 2003 Asian Winter Games.

Education
Ōwani has one public elementary school and one public junior high school operated by the town government. The town's only high school, a branch of Hirosaki Minami High School, closed in 2013.

Transportation

Railway
 East Japan Railway Company (JR East) - Ōu Main Line
 -  
  - Kōnan Railway Ōwani Line
 -  -

Highway
  – Owani Interchange

Local attractions
 Ōwani onsen
 Daien-ji

Noted people from Ōwani 
Wakanohana Kanji II, sumo wrestler

Olympic skiers 
Shinzo Yamada, 1936 Winter Olympics
Ginzo Yamada, 1936 Winter Olympics
Kenichi Yamamoto, 1952 Winter Olympics
Yuji Yamanaka, 1964 Winter Olympics
Akiyoshi Matsuoka, 1968 Winter Olympics and 1972 Winter Olympics
Hideaki Yamada, 1984 Winter Olympics
Nobuko Fukuda,  2002 Winter Olympics, 2006 Winter Olympics and 2010 Winter Olympics

Sister cities
  - Novi, Michigan, United States (in Metro Detroit)

References

External links

 

 
Towns in Aomori Prefecture